Windsor was a train station in Windsor, Ontario, Canada. The station was built by the Michigan Central Railroad in 1911 and subsequently controlled by the Canada Southern Railway. The station served Canada Southern Railway and New York Central trains. Windsor also has another railroad station in town. 

Through most of its decades, and into the latter 1960s, the station served New York Central passenger trains over a New York–Buffalo–Windsor–Detroit–Jackson–Chicago route: the Empire State Express and the Wolverine. It also served trains bound for a slightly more northerly route east: to London, Toronto and Montreal: the New York Central-Canadian Pacific pooled train, the Canadian (later renamed the Canadian-Niagara).

The last train service to this station was Amtrak's Niagara Rainbow from October 1978 to January 31, 1979. The building was burnt to the ground in 1996 due to arson.

References

External links

 Windsor, Ontario (USA RailGuide – TrainWeb)

Former Amtrak stations in Canada
Buildings and structures in Windsor, Ontario
Rail transport in Windsor, Ontario
Disused railway stations in Canada
Railway stations in Canada opened in 1911
Railway stations closed in 1979
Railway stations in Essex County, Ontario
Former Michigan Central Railroad stations
Canadian National Railway stations in Ontario
Buildings and structures in Canada destroyed by arson
Demolished buildings and structures in Ontario
1911 establishments in Ontario